The 2011 Pan American Aerobic Gymnastics Championships were held in Yaracuy, Venezuela, August 2–8, 2011.

Medalists

References

Pan American Aerobic Gymnastics Championships
International gymnastics competitions hosted by Venezuela
Pan American Aerobic Gymnastics Championships
Pan American Aerobic Gymnastics Championships
Pan American Gymnastics Championships